The Stolen Loaf is a 1913 American drama film directed by  D. W. Griffith.

Cast
 Henry B. Walthall as The poor man
 Kate Bruce as The poor man's wife
 Claire McDowell as The Rich Woman
 Harry Carey as The Butler
 William A. Carroll as At Dinner
 Charles Hill Mailes as At Dinner

See also
 Harry Carey filmography
 D. W. Griffith filmography

External links

1913 films
Films directed by D. W. Griffith
American silent short films
American black-and-white films
1913 drama films
1913 short films
Silent American drama films
1910s American films